Waferboard belongs to the subset of reconstituted wood panel products called flakeboards. It is a structural material made from rectangular wood flakes of controlled length and thickness bonded together with waterproof phenolic resin under extreme heat and pressure. The layers of flakes are not oriented, which makes it easier to manufacture. Waferboard is used as a material to build cheap furniture. This type of furniture is usually laminated.

See also
Particleboard
Oriented strand board (OSB)
Haskelite, an early type of plywood

References

Engineered wood
Composite materials